HMS H47 was a British H class submarine built by William Beardmore and Company, Dalmuir. She was laid down on 20 November 1917 and was commissioned on 25 February 1919. It had a complement of twenty-two crew members. HMS H47 was sunk in a collision with British L class submarine L12 off Milford Haven, Wales on 9 July 1929. Twenty one of the crew were lost with only three survivors.

Design

H47 was fitted with an anti-aircraft gun and four  torpedo tubes. Its torpedo tubes were fitted to the bows and the submarine was loaded with eight  torpedoes. It is a Holland 602 type submarine but was designed to meet Royal Navy specifications. Its complement was twenty-two crew members.

References

Bibliography
 

 

British H-class submarines
Ships built on the River Clyde
1918 ships
Royal Navy ship names
Maritime incidents in 1929
Shipwrecks in the Irish Sea
Submarines sunk in collisions